Eurylasma is a genus of symmetrical sessile barnacles in the family Pachylasmatidae. There are at least three described species in Eurylasma.

Species
These species belong to the genus Eurylasma:
 Eurylasma angustum Jones, 2000
 Eurylasma ferulum Jones, 2000
 Eurylasma pyramidale Jones, 2000

References

External links

 

Barnacles